Amritlal Vallabhdas Tarwala is an Indian politician. He was elected to the Lok Sabha, lower house of the Parliament of India from Khandwa, Madhya Pradesh as a member of the Bharatiya Janata Party.

References

External links
 Official biographical sketch in Parliament of India website

Lok Sabha members from Madhya Pradesh
India MPs 1989–1991
Indian National Congress politicians
1947 births
2008 deaths